Poppy Pattinson  (born 30 April 2000) is an English professional footballer who plays as a left-back for Brighton & Hove Albion of the English Women's Super League.

Club career

Early years
Pattinson started her youth career at Sunderland Girls' Academy where she played from the age of 8 until she was 13 years old. In 2013, Pattinson moved to play at Middlesbrough.

Sunderland
In 2015, Pattinson returned to Sunderland. She made two WSL 1 appearances for the club during the 2017 Spring Series.

Manchester City
Ahead of the 2017–18 season, Pattinson signed for Manchester City. On 20 August 2017, she made an appearance for the senior team in a preseason friendly defeat to Bundesliga side 1. FFC Frankfurt. Pattinson was involved in one senior competitive matchday squad, as an unused substitute in a WSL Cup group stage victory over Doncaster Rovers Belles in December 2017. Manchester City's Development team won both the FA WSL Academy League Northern Division and the Development League Cup in a 3–1 victory over Birmingham City Academy in 2017–18. Pattinson made 15 appearances across both competitions.

Bristol City
Pattinson signed for Bristol City in August 2018. Signed in the first window under new manager Tanya Oxtoby, she became an integral part of the team, appearing in all but one WSL game as Bristol finished 6th. A foot injury caused Pattinson to miss the first half of the 2019–20 season, only returning to the side in December as the team battled relegation. She spent two seasons with the club, deciding to leave after the expiration of her contract in June 2020 despite what the club admitted in their statement was substantial offer to retain her services.

Everton
On 7 July 2020, it was announced Pattinson had signed a two-year deal with Everton. She left Everton at the end of her contract in June 2022.

Brighton & Hove Albion
On 13 July 2022, Pattinson signed a two-year contract with Brighton & Hove Albion.

International career
Pattinson has represented England at under-17 and under-19 and under-21 level.

In 2017, Pattinson was part of the squad that competed at the 2017 UEFA Women's Under-17 Championship in the Czech Republic. She scored England's first goal of the tournament, a 9th minute strike in a 5–0 win over the Republic of Ireland. In 2017, Pattinson was part of the squad that went through 2018 UEFA Women's Under-19 Championship qualification, eventually losing out to Germany in the elite round. The team did however qualify the following year with Pattinson playing five times during both stages of 2019 UEFA Women's Under-19 Championship qualification but was not selected in the squad for the tournament proper in July 2019. Instead she was called up for the under-21 team for the U23 Open Nordic Tournament, appearing in a 4–1 over the Netherlands on 1 June 2019. She was involved with the under-21 team again in March 2020 for a double-header of friendlies against France with England winning both.

Career statistics

Club
.

References

External links
 Poppy Pattinson on Twitter
 
 

2000 births
Living people
Women's association football defenders
English women's footballers
Women's Super League players
Sunderland A.F.C. Ladies players
Manchester City W.F.C. players
Bristol City W.F.C. players
Everton F.C. (women) players
England women's under-21 international footballers